Lisa Mason is an American writer of science fiction, fantasy, and urban fantasy. She lives in Piedmont, California with her husband, the artist and jeweler Tom Robinson. She is a Phi Beta Kappa scholar and graduate of the University of Michigan, the College of Literature, Sciences, and the Arts, and the University of Michigan Law School. She practiced law in Washington D.C. and San Francisco. To have more time to write, she transitioned to Matthew Bender and Company, a national law book publisher, where she started as a legal writer and rose to an executive editor. Many of her novels take place in the vicinity of San Francisco, California, either in the future or in the past through time travel. Her early works are recognized as cyberpunk. She has also written paranormal romance, historical romantic suspense, comedy, and a screenplay.

Works

Novels
Arachne (William Morrow/Avon/Eos, 1990)
Summer of Love (Bantam, 1994)
Cyberweb (William Morrow/Avon/Eos, 1995)
The Golden Nineties (Bantam, 1995)
Pangaea I: Imperium without End (Bantam, 1999)
Pangaea II: Imperium Aflame (Bantam, 2000)
 Summer of Love, A Time Travel (2010) Bast Books ebook
 Summer of Love (2017) Bast Books ebook and print book
The Gilded Age, A Time Travel (2011) Bast Books ebook and print book
The Garden of Abracadabra (2012) Bast Books ebook and print book
Eon's Kiss (as Suzanna Moore) (2012) Bast Books ebook
Strange Ladies: 7 Stories (2013) Bast Books ebook and print book (Collection of previously published work including "The Oniomancer," "Guardian," "Felicitas," "Stripper," "Triad," "Destination," and "Transformation and the Postmodern Identity Crisis.")
Celestial Girl Omnibus Edition (A Lily Modjeska Mystery) (2013) Bast Books ebook
Shaken (2013) Bast Books ebook (Expansion of Deus Ex Machina published in Asimov's Science Fiction Magazine)
My Charlotte: Patty's Story (2014) Bast Books ebook
Tesla, A Worthy of His Time (A Screenplay) (2014) Bast Books ebook
One Day in the Life of Alexa (2017) Bast Books ebook and print book
CHROME (2019) Bast Books ebook and print book
Arachne (2017) Bast Books ebook and print book
Cyberweb (2017) Bast Books ebook and print book
ODDITIES: 22 Stories (2020) Bast Books ebook and print book

Short fiction
Arachne (Omni, 1987, Hayakawa, 1988, Replik, 1989)
Future Law (1987)
Deus Ex Machina (Asimov's Science Fiction Magazine, 1988, Transcendental Tales from Asimov, 1989))
Guardian (Asimov's Science Fiction Magazine, 1988)
The Onionmancer (Asimov's Science Fiction Magazine, 1989)
Tomorrow's Child (Omni Magazine, 1989) Sold outright to Universal Studios, now in development.
Hummers (Asimov's Science Fiction Magazine, 1991)
Stripper (Unique Magazine, 1991)
Destination (Magazine of Fantasy and Science Fiction, 1992)
Triad (Universe 2, Bantam, 1994)
Daughter of the Tao (Immortal Unicorn, HarperPrism, 1995)
Every Mystery Unexplained (Tales of the Impossible, HarperPrism, 1995)
Felicitas (Desire Burn: Women Writing From the Dark Side of Passion, Carrol & Graf, 1995)
Transformation and the Postmodern Identity Crisis (Fantastic Alice, Ace, 1995)
The Sixty-Third Anniversary of Hysteria (Full Spectrum 5, Bantam, 1995)
The Hanged Man (The Shimmering Door, HarperPrism, 1996)
U F uh-O, A Sci Fi Comedy (2011) Bast Books ebook
Tomorrow's Child (2012) Includes Mason's thirty-day blog, The Story Behind the Story That Sold to the Movies Bast Books ebook
Daughter of the Tao (2012) Bast Books ebook
Every Mystery Unexplained (2012) Bast Books ebook
Shaken (2012) Bast Books ebook
Hummers (2013) Bast Books ebook
The Sixty-third Anniversary of Hysteria (2013) Bast Books ebook
Strange Ladies: 7 Stories (2013) Bast Books ebook (Collection of previously published work including "The Oniomancer," "Guardian," "Felicitas," "Stripper," "Triad," "Destination," and "Transformation and the Postmodern Identity Crisis.")
My Charlotte: Patty's Story (includes Arachne) (2014) Bast Books ebook
Teardrop (Magazine of Fantasy and Science Fiction, May/June 2015)
Tomorrow Is A Lovely Day (Magazine of Fantasy and Science Fiction, November/December 2015)
Anything For You (Magazine of Fantasy and Science Fiction, September/October 2016)
Riddle (Magazine of Fantasy and Science Fiction, September/October 2017)
Aurelia (Magazine of Fantasy and Science Fiction, January–February 2018)
Dangerous WELCOME TO DYSTOPIA: Forty-five Visions of What Lies Ahead (O/R Books) (January 2018)
The Bicycle Whisperer (Magazine of Fantasy and Science Fiction, May–June 2018)
Taiga (Not One of Us Digest # 61, April 2019)
Bess (Daily Science Fiction May 2019)
Crazy Chimera Lady (Patreon.com/lisamasonfantasyandsciencefictionwriter Tier 2, August 2019)

Essays and articles
Journey of the Heart (1991)
Read This (The New York review of Science Fiction, 1994
Lisa Mason: Politics and Ecstasy (Interview Locus, The Newspaper of the Science Fiction Field Issue # 400)
Image of the Spider (Interview Starlog September, 1992)

Awards
Philip K. Dick Award - Best Novel nominee 1994 : Summer of Love
San Francisco Chronicle Recommended Book, Summer of Love
New York Times Notable Book, The Golden Nineties//The Gilded Age: A Time Travel
New York Public Library Recommended Book, The Golden Nineties//The Gilded Age: A Time Travel
The Year's Best Fantasy and Horror, 5th Annual Collection (St. Martin's Press) Hummers''

External links

Lisa Mason's Website
1998 Interview with Lisa Mason
Fantastic Fiction entry

Lisa Mason's Blog
Lisa Mason on Facebook
Lisa Mason's Facebook Fan Page
Lisa Mason on Goodreads
Lisa Mason on Twitter
Lisa’s Patreon

20th-century American novelists
American science fiction writers
American women short story writers
American women novelists
Cyberpunk writers
1953 births
Living people
Women science fiction and fantasy writers
20th-century American women writers
University of Michigan Law School alumni
20th-century American short story writers
21st-century American women writers